I'm Not Through Loving You Yet may refer to:
I'm Not Through Loving You Yet (album), by Conway Twitty
"I'm Not Through Loving You Yet" (Conway Twitty song)
"I'm Not Through Loving You Yet" (Louise Mandrell song)